Erioneuron is a genus of New World plants in the grass family native to southern North America and southern South America. They are sometimes called by the common name woollygrass. These are tufty grasses with hairy spikelets.

 Species
 Erioneuron avenaceum (Kunth) Tateoka - shortleaf woollygrass -  United States (AZ NM TX), Mexico (from Chihuahua to Oaxaca)
 Erioneuron pilosum (Buckley) Nash - hairy woollygrass -  United States (AZ NM TX OK KS CO UT NV CA), Mexico (from Chihuahua to Oaxaca), Argentina, Bolivia

 formerly included 
 Erioneuron pulchellum - Dasyochloa pulchella

References

Chloridoideae
Poaceae genera